Ben Lessy (April 29, 1902 – October 30, 1992) was an American nightclub comedian and television and film actor.

Early life
He was born in New York City, New York.

Career

Lessy was known for a nightclub act done with Patti Moore, the long-time wife of his best friend and agent, Sammy Lewis. They were regulars at Los Angeles nightclubs 
Slapsy Maxie's and Billy Gray's Band Box. Lessy appeared in over 50 films and television episodes between 1938 and 1981. His first film role was in the two reel Cafe Rendezvous (1938) and his career ended with the Billy Wilder film Buddy Buddy (1981).
Lessy's film credits include Music for Millions (1944), Dark Delusion (1947) (the last entry in the Metro-Goldwyn-Mayer Dr. Kildare series),The Pirate (1948) (Lessy's 9th, and final film during his seven years at MGM),The Jackie Robinson Story (1950),  Just for You (1952), Gypsy (1962), It's a Mad, Mad, Mad, Mad World (1963), Pajama Party (1964), That Darn Cat! (1965), and The Love Machine (1971). His television credits include Make Room for Daddy (1953–59: 19 episodes), The Jack Benny Program (1959–64: 3 episodes), The Cara Williams Show (1964–1965), That Girl (1966), Petticoat Junction (1967), The New Andy Griffith Show (1971), and McMillan & Wife (1976).

Lessy died on October 30, 1992, aged 90 from natural causes.

Filmography

Second Chorus (1940) - Shaw's Second Manager (uncredited)
Woman of the Year (1942) - Punchy (uncredited)
For Me and My Gal (1942) - Dough Boy Dan (uncredited)
Youth on Parade (1942) - Piano Player (uncredited)
Thousands Cheer (1943) - Silent Monk
Music for Millions (1944) - Kickebush
Her Highness and the Bellboy (1945) - Himself
Two Sisters from Boston (1946) - Rogetto - Olstrom's Valet (uncredited)
Dark Delusion (1947) - Napoleon
The Pirate (1948) - Gumbo
The Jackie Robinson Story (1950) - Shorty
Purple Heart Diary (1951) - Himself
Just for You (1952) - Georgie Polansky
Gypsy (1962) - Mervyn Goldstone
It's a Mad, Mad, Mad, Mad World (1963) - George, the steward (uncredited)
I'd Rather Be Rich (1964) - 1st Hunter (uncredited)
Pajama Party (1964) - Fleegle
That Funny Feeling (1965) - Charlie - Bartender
That Darn Cat! (1965) - Drive-In Concessionaire (uncredited)
The Last of the Secret Agents? (1966) - Harry
The Fastest Guitar Alive (1967) - Indian Chief
The Love Machine (1971) - Kenny Ditto
Buddy Buddy (1981) - Barney Pritzig (final film role)

External links

References

1902 births
1992 deaths
Male actors from New York City
American male film actors
American male television actors
American male comedians
20th-century American male actors
Comedians from New York City
20th-century American comedians